The 51st Guldbagge Awards ceremony, presented by the Swedish Film Institute, honoring the best Swedish films of 2015, was held on 18 January 2016.

Winners and nominees 
The nominees for the 51st Guldbagge Awards were announced on 8 January 2016 in Stockholm, by the Swedish Film Institute.

Awards 

Winners are listed first and highlighted in boldface.

References

External links 

51st Guldbagge Awards at Internet Movie Database

2016 in Swedish cinema
2016 film awards
2010s in Stockholm
Guldbagge Awards ceremonies
January 2016 events in Europe